Honeymoon (French: Lune de miel) is a 1985 Franco-Canadian thriller, directed by Patrick Jamain and starring Nathalie Baye.

Plot
A Frenchwoman in Manhattan, in danger of being deported because of her relationship with a recently arrested drug offender, enters into a marriage of convenience with a stranger that is arranged through an agency. But even though the two are not supposed to even meet, her new husband starts taking his faux wedding vows entirely too seriously.

Availability
The movie was released on videocassette in 1986 by Karl-Lorimar Home Video in the United States and in Canada by New World Video. The VHS cover marketed the film as a horror film. As of March 16, 2010, no plans have been made to release the film onto DVD.

Cast
Nathalie Baye as  Cécile Carline
John Shea as  Zachary 'Zack' Freestamp
Richard Berry as  Michel
Marla Lukofsky as  Sally
Michel Beaune as  Maître Garnier
Peter Donat as  Novak
Alf Humphreys as  Sonny
Cec Linder as  Barnes
Greg Ellwand as  Bill
Arthur Grosser as  Forrester
Shirley Merovitz as  Mrs. Silvera
Irene Kessler as  Mrs. Goldberg
Adriana Roach as  Thelma
Ken Roberts as  Snack bar customer
Sam Stone as  Taxidriver
Paul Bertoya as  Blythe
Steve Michaels as  Jackson
Tyrone Benskin as  Weapon seller
Morris Rosengarten as  Dunning

External links
 

1985 films
1985 thriller films
French thriller films
Canadian thriller films
Films set in the United States
Films about immigration to the United States
English-language French films
1980s Canadian films
1980s French films